Robin Raymond (born Rayemon Robin, October 4, 1916 – June 20, 1994) was an American film actress.

Early life 
Raymond graduated from Northwestern University with a BA degree and worked as a press agent in Chicago.

Personal life 
Raymond appeared in over 40 films including Johnny Eager (1942) and as a slave girl in Arabian Nights (1942). One of her more memorable roles may have been that of a good-hearted burlesque dancer Tanya Zakoyla in the film noir The Glass Wall (1953).  She appeared in Episode 32 (Alpine, Texas) of Trackdown. She was sometimes credited as Robyn Raymond.

On Broadway, Raymond portrayed Blossom Le Verne in See My Lawyer (1939).

Death 
Raymond married nightclub owner Norman E. Heeb in Las Vegas, Nevada, on June 15, 1941. They were divorced on November 28, 1941. On January 26, 1947, she married multimillionaire Harry A. Epstein in Yuma, Arizona. They were divorced on February 16, 1955.

Partial filmography

 For Love or Money (1939) - Maid
 Johnny Eager (1941) - Matilda
 Ship Ahoy (1942) - Cigarette Girl (uncredited)
 Moontide (1942) - Mildred
 The Tuttles of Tahiti (1942) - Maitu (uncredited)
 Sunday Punch (1942) - Vicky (uncredited)
 Tortilla Flat (1942) - Woman (uncredited)
 The Affairs of Martha (1942) - Juanita (uncredited)
 Calling Dr. Gillespie (1942) - Bubbles
 Secrets of the Underground (1942) - Marianne Panois
 Arabian Nights (1942) - Slave Girl
 Slightly Dangerous (1943) - Girl (uncredited)
 Girls in Chains (1943) - Rita Randall
 Let's Face It (1943) - Mimi (uncredited)
 Hi'ya, Sailor (1943) - Margie (uncredited)
 His Butler's Sister (1943) - Sunshine Twin
 Standing Room Only (1944) - Assembly Line Worker (uncredited)
 Ladies of Washington (1944) - Vicky O'Reilly
 Ghost Catchers (1944) - Miss Ware (uncredited)
 Are These Our Parents? (1944) - Mona Larson
 Sweet and Low-Down (1944) - Blonde (uncredited)
 Rogues' Gallery (1944) - Patsy Clark
 The Clock (1945) - Check Room Attendant (uncredited)
 Men in Her Diary (1945) - Stella
 Tars and Spars (1946) - Recording Studio Pitch Woman (uncredited)
 A Letter for Evie (1946) - Eloise Edgewaters
 Talk About a Lady (1946) - 'Peaches' Barkeley
 The Man I Love (1946) - Lee (uncredited)
 Johnny O'Clock (1947) - Hatcheck Girl (uncredited)
 A Likely Story (1947) - Ticket Girl
 The Web (1947) - Newspaper Librarian
 The Prince of Thieves (1948) - Maude (uncredited)
 French Leave (1948) - Simone
 Mighty Joe Young (1949) - Nightclub Dancer (uncredited)
 Wabash Avenue (1950) - Jennie
 Valentino (1951) - Blonde Waitress (uncredited)
 The Sniper (1952) - Woman Dunked at Carnival Concession (uncredited)
 The Glass Wall (1953) - Tanya aka Bella Zakoyla
 There's No Business Like Show Business (1954) - Lillian Sawyer
 Young at Heart (1954) - Restaurant Patron (uncredited)
 Beyond a Reasonable Doubt (1956) - Terry Larue
 Jailhouse Rock (1957) - Dotty (uncredited)
 High School Confidential (1958) - Kitty
 Wild in the Country (1961) - Flossie
 Twilight of Honor (1963) - Tess Braden
 The Candidate (1964) - Attorney Rogers
 Young Dillinger (1965)
 Pendulum (1969) - Myra
 Psychic Killer (1975) - Jury Foreman
 The Black Marble (1980) - Millie

References

External links

 
 

1916 births
1994 deaths
American film actresses
Place of birth missing
Actresses from Chicago
20th-century American actresses
Northwestern University alumni